The 2016 Unibet Masters was the fourth staging of the non-ranking Masters darts tournament, held by the Professional Darts Corporation. It was held between 30–31 January 2016 at the Arena MK in Milton Keynes, England.

Michael van Gerwen retained his 2015 title, beating Dave Chisnall 11–6 in the tournament's final.

Qualifiers
The Masters only features the top 16 players in the PDC Order of Merit. These are:

  Michael van Gerwen (winner)
  Gary Anderson (first round)
  Adrian Lewis (first round)
  Phil Taylor (semi-finals)
  Peter Wright (quarter-finals)
  James Wade (semi-finals)
  Robert Thornton (first round)
  Michael Smith (quarter-finals)
  Raymond van Barneveld (first round)
  Dave Chisnall (runner-up)
  Terry Jenkins (first round)
  Ian White (first round)
  Jelle Klaasen (first round)
  Kim Huybrechts (quarter-finals)
  Vincent van der Voort (quarter-finals)
  Stephen Bunting (first round)

Prize money
The total prize fund is £200,000.

Draw

References

Masters
Masters (darts)
Masters (darts)
Masters (darts)
Sport in Milton Keynes
2010s in Buckinghamshire